Pekkala is a Finnish surname. Notable people with the surname include:

Ahti Pekkala (1924-2014), Finnish politician
Eino Pekkala (1887–1956), Finnish politician
Mary Pekkala (1889–1975), British-born Finnish civil rights activist
Mauno Pekkala (1890–1952), Finnish politician
Tomi Pekkala (born 1988), Finnish ice-hockey player
Vilho Pekkala (1898–1974), Finnish wrestler

Finnish-language surnames